Huma Nawab is a Pakistani actress. She played major roles in Chand Grehan, Aahat, Nijaat, Hawain, and Silsila.

Early life
Nawab was born in 1969 in Islamabad, Pakistan. She completed her education at the University of Islamabad.

Career
Huma did theatre stage plays at school and Chand Grehan was her most successful drama and her pairing with Ayaz Naik was quite popular. She is noted for her husky voice, well-suited to the strong characters she played in dramatic works. Nijaat and Dhoop Mein Sawan are other famous shows she performed in. She started her career in the mid-80s with Silsila and continued working till 1999, after which she went to America. Huma returned to Pakistan briefly in 2012, then again in 2014, and permanently in 2015. Since then, she has been prolific with some of her noted projects being Yaqeen Ka Safar, Deedan, Surkh Chandni, Mein Na Janoo, Dil Ruba, and Hum Kahan Ke Sachay Thay.

Personal life
In 2012, she came back to Pakistan, fulfilling her mother's wish who wanted to be buried next to her husband after being diagnosed with blood cancer. Huma is unmarried and lives in Islamabad. Huma's mother Fatima Nawab was also an actress.

Filmography

Television

Telefilm

Film

Awards and nominations

References

External links
 
 Huma Nawab reveals why did she not get married Ary News.

1969 births
People from Islamabad
Living people
20th-century Pakistani actresses
21st-century Pakistani actresses
Pakistani television actresses
PTV Award winners
Pakistani film actresses